The following highways are numbered 143:

Canada
  Prince Edward Island Route 143
  Quebec Route 143

Costa Rica
 National Route 143

Germany
 Bundesautobahn 143

Japan
 Japan National Route 143
 Fukuoka Prefectural Route 143
 Nara Prefectural Route 143

Malaysia
 Malaysia Federal Route 143

United States
 U.S. Highway 143 (former)
 Alabama State Route 143
 Arizona State Route 143
 Arkansas Highway 143
 California State Route 143 (unbuilt)
 Florida State Road 143
 County Road 143 (Hamilton County, Florida)
 Georgia State Route 143 (former)
 Illinois Route 143
 Indiana State Road 143
 Iowa Highway 143
 K-143 (Kansas highway)
 Kentucky Route 143
 Louisiana Highway 143
 Maine State Route 143
 Maryland Route 143 (former)
 Massachusetts Route 143
 M-143 (Michigan highway) (one former and one current highway)
 Missouri Route 143
 New Jersey Route 143
 New Mexico State Road 143
 New York State Route 143
 County Route 143 (Fulton County, New York)
 County Route 143 (Niagara County, New York)
 County Route 143 (Wayne County, New York)
 County Route 143 (Westchester County, New York)
 North Carolina Highway 143
 Ohio State Route 143
 Oklahoma State Highway 143 (former)
 Pennsylvania Route 143
 Tennessee State Route 143
 Texas State Highway 143 (former)
 Texas State Highway Loop 143
 Texas State Highway Spur 143 (former)
 Farm to Market Road 143
 Utah State Route 143
 Vermont Route 143
 Virginia State Route 143
 Virginia State Route 143 (1923-1928) (former)
 Virginia State Route 143 (1933-1942) (former)
 Washington State Route 143 (two former highways)
 Wisconsin Highway 143

Territories
 Puerto Rico Highway 143